Amritsar Central Assembly constituency (Sl. No.: 17) is a Punjab Legislative Assembly constituency in Amritsar district, Punjab state, India.

Members of Legislative Assembly

Election results

2022

2017

2012

References

External links
  

Assembly constituencies of Punjab, India
Amritsar district